The Polish language, like most others, has swear words and profanity. Some words are not always seen as very insulting, however, there are others that are considered by some greatly offensive and rude. Words that might be considered most derogatory, based on multiple sources, are not necessarily a general and have not been decided upon in a more definite manner.

There are different types of swearing (as coined by Steven Pinker): abusive, cathartic, dysphemistic, emphatic and idiomatic.

The Polish language uses all types of swearing mentioned. Research has shown that "Polish people hear profanity more often in a public space than in a private space". 65% of surveyed adults said they have sworn due to emotions and only 21% claimed they never swore.

The CBOS (The Center for Public Opinion Research) has done surveys to examine the use of profanity. In the research report, it was pointed out that information given about the private sector might not be accurate, as it is a protected and idealized space, meaning that the subjects of the survey could be downplaying or changing their answers providing a false report.

Most commonly used vulgarisms 
Linguist Jerzy Bralczyk calculated that there are only five basic vulgarisms in Polish. These are "cock" (chuj), "cunt" (pizda), "fuck" (pierdolić, jebać) and "whore/shit/fuck" (kurwa). The rest are combinations of these five, derived words and phraseological relationships. New vulgarisms appear when new word configurations are created or their semantic context changes. The dictionary of real Polish gives four words in 350 configurations, including the word "shit" in 47 functions.

Sex-related obscenities

Vagina 

Cipa 
Pronunciation: IPA:
 Literally "pussy". Another form of the word is the diminutive "cipka", which is usually not considered as crude.
 An insult towards a female.
 A person that is considered incompetent. 

Pizda
Pronunciation: IPA:
 Like "cipa", only more vulgar. Similar to the English "cunt".
 A black eye.

Penis 

Chuj
Sometimes incorrectly written as "huj".
Pronunciation: IPA:
 "Dick" or "cock". The diminutive form of the word is "chujek". 
 A rude person, mostly used towards males. 
 A disliked male. 

Chujowy
Sometimes incorrectly written as "hujowy".
Pronunciation: IPA:
 An adjective derived from "chuj", literally meaning "dick-like". "Chujowy" is the masculine form, the feminine form is "chujowa" and the neuter form is "chujowe".
 Often used to describe an object (or situation) of a rather deplorable or otherwise undesirable quality, e.g. "Chujowy samochód" meaning "A vehicle that broadly fails in its utility to be of use (breaks down often, looks like crap, etc.)"

Chujowo
Sometimes incorrectly written as "hujowo".
Pronunciation: IPA:
 An adverb derived from "chuj". 
 Used to describe a bad way of doing something (rarely). 
 Used to describe a bad state of being. 

Pierdolić się 
Pronunciation: IPA:
 To have sex.
 To be overly cautious with something.

Jebać 
Pronunciation: IPA:
 To smell bad
 “To fuck”/have sex with someone. This word has many derivative words as well, and is in fact one of the most versatile words in the Polish language. Examples include:

Pieprzyć 
Pronunciation: IPA:
 “To fuck” or to have sex.
 To lie, talk nonsense.
 To disregard something or someone as unimportant (similar to the English expression “fuck this”/“fuck you”). In a non-vulgar instance it means to add pepper.

Pierdolić 
Pronunciation: IPA:
 To have sex, “to fuck”.
 To regard something as irrelevant, not worth attention.
 To lie, talk nonsense.

Robić loda 
Pronunciation: IPA:
To “give a blowjob”. Literally translates to “do an ice cream / a popsicle”.

Ruchać 
Pronunciation: IPA:
To have sex with someone, to “fuck someone”.

Rżnąć 
Pronunciation: IPA:
To have sex or “to fuck”. Also has multiple non-vulgar meanings, e.g. "to saw".

Wypierdalać 
Pronunciation: IPA:
 To kick someone out.
 To get away from somewhere.
 To throw something away.

Insultive racial terms 

Ciemno jak w dupie (u) Murzyna 
Pronunciation: IPA:
Very dark. Literally "as dark as the inside of a Negro's ass"

Skośny
Pronunciation: IPA:
 An offensive term for an Asian person.
 In a non-vulgar context: diagonal. 

Żółtek
Pronunciation: IPA:
 An offensive term for an Asian person, literally "yellowie".
 Pope John Paul II, mockingly referred to as rzułta morda (lit. yellowface)

Ciapaty
Pronunciation: IPA:
 An offensive term for a person of a slightly darker skin color but not black, usually Southern Asian, people from the Middle East. 
 Word probably comes from "ćapati", a type of flat bread traditionally made in India and Pakistan.

LGBT-related insults 

Pedał
Pronunciation: IPA:
Faggot (a gay man). Literally "pedal".

Insults 

Cipa 
Pronunciation: IPA:
(See above)

Chuj 
Pronunciation: IPA:
(See above)

Ciota 
Pronunciation: IPA:
 Period, menstruation.
 An insulting way to call a homosexual, usually one behaving in an overly feminine way.

Cwel 
Pronunciation: IPA:
 A male providing sexual services to homosexual inmates in prison
 An insult towards a male.

Do dupy 
Pronunciation: IPA:
For something or someone thought no good, useless.

Dziwka 
Pronunciation: IPA:
 A prostitute, hooker.
 An insult towards a female.

Frajer 
Pronunciation: IPA:
 A naive person.
 A loser. 

Matkojebca
Pronunciation: IPA:
 Same as the English "motherfucker".

Menda 
Pronunciation: IPA:
 A policeman.
 A greedy or clumsy person.

Męska kurwa 
Pronunciation: IPA:
A male prostitute.

Skurwiel 
Pronunciation: IPA:
An insult towards a male.

Skurwysyn 
Pronunciation: IPA:
An insult towards a male. Similar to the English “son of a bitch”.

Suka 
Pronunciation: IPA:
 An insult used towards females. Same as “bitch” in English.
 Non-vulgar: a female dog.
 A male sexually submissive to another male.

Świnia 
Pronunciation: IPA:
 A person behaving in a way that is seen as obscene. Same as calling someone a pig in English.
 Non-vulgar: a pig.

Zdzira 
Pronunciation: IPA:
 A female prostitute.
 An insult towards a female.

Discriminative terms 

Ciota
Pronunciation: IPA:
(See above)

Cwel 
Pronunciation: IPA:
(See above)

Pedał 
Pronunciation: IPA:
 An insult towards a gay man or a male perceived as gay.
 Non-vulgar: a pedal.

Others 

Dojebać
Pronunciation: IPA:

 1. To beat someone up, give someone a beating.
 2. To add something to something else in high amounts, e.g. pepper to a soup.

Dopierdalać
Pronunciation: IPA:
 To beat someone up, give someone a beating.
 To talk nonsense. 

Dopieprzać
Pronunciation: IPA:
 Same as "dopierdalać" but less vulgar.

Dupa
Pronunciation: IPA:
 Ass. 
 A scaredy cat. 
 Insult towards a man. 
 A vulgar way to call an attractive woman. 
 Girlfriend (preferably when discussed in her absence, unless she's a ździra).

Gówno
Pronunciation: IPA:
 Feces, literally “shit”.
 Used as an insult towards a person seen as someone not worthy of attention.
 Something useless, worth nothing.
 Can also literally mean “nothing”, similar to "jack shit" or "fuck all".

Japa 
Pronunciation: IPA:
Used to refer to someone’s face, similar to the English "mug".

Jasna cholera 
Pronunciation: IPA:
A word to express frustration. Similar to “holy shit” in English.

Kiblować
Pronunciation: IPA:
 To be serving a sentence in prison.
 To repeat a grade in school.

Kurwa
Pronunciation: IPA:
 A female prostitute.
 An immoral, unethical person.
 An expression of frustration, like “fuck!” in English.
 A filler like “fucking” in an English sentence, e.g. “I hate this fucking show”.

Kurestwo
Pronunciation: IPA:
 A broken object. 
 A bad tasting dish/drink. 
 A substance that is unpleasant to touch or smell. 

Kurwiarz
Pronunciation: IPA:
 A man frequently who frequently engages in sex with prostitutes. 
 A man cheating on his wife. 

Kurwidołek
Pronunciation: IPA:
 A brothel. 
 Any place where prostitutes can frequently be encountered. 
 The flat of a man who frequently invites multiple women over to have sex with them. 

Mieć nasrane w głowie
Pronunciation: IPA:
To behave weirdly, illogically, with no sense.

Morda w kubeł 
Pronunciation: IPA:
Used to tell someone to be quiet, to stop talking, to shut up.

Na odpieprz/odpierdol 
Pronunciation: IPA:
To do something without much care or thought.

Najebać 
Pronunciation: IPA:
 To be drunk/have had too much to drink.
 To add too much of something.
 To beat someone up.

Niech to szlag trafi 
Pronunciation: IPA:
An expletive used to express frustration. Similar to “dammit” or “shit” in English.

Opierdalać
Pronunciation: IPA:
 To be lazy. 
 To quickly peel something. 
 To perform fellatio. 

Obesrać/obsrać
Pronunciation: IPA:
To dirty someone or something with feces.

Pierdolić 
Pronunciation: IPA:
 To have sex, “to fuck”.
 To regard something as irrelevant, not worth attention.
 To lie, talk nonsense.

Robić w chuja 
Pronunciation: IPA:
To fool someone.

Samojebka 
Pronunciation: IPA:
To take a picture of yourself, to take a selfie.

Srać 
Pronunciation: IPA:
 To defecate, “to (take a) shit”.
 To regard something as irrelevant, not worth attention.
Sometimes it is followed by "taśma" to create the word "srajtaśma". The literal translation is "shit-tape" and it refers to toilet paper.

Srać w gacie 
Pronunciation: IPA:
To be very afraid, nervous. Literally "to be shitting your pants".

Szajs 
Pronunciation: IPA:
 Feces, literally “shit”.
 Something worthless, of bad quality.
When the word "papier", meaning paper, is added after it makes "szajspapier". Literally, it means "shitpaper" and is used to refer to toilet paper.

Szczać 
Pronunciation: IPA:
To release urine, to pee. Literally: "to piss".

Walić konia 
Pronunciation: IPA:
To jerk off, to masturbate. Literally: ”to beat the horse”.

Wkurwiać 
Pronunciation: IPA:
To annoy someone or to “piss someone off”.

Wpaść po uszy w gówno 
Pronunciation: IPA:
To be in a lot of trouble. Literally translates to “fall into shit to the ears”. Similar to the English phrase “to be in deep shit”.

Wyglądać jak pół dupy zza krzaka 
Pronunciation: IPA:
To look strange, weird. Literally translates to “look like half an ass from behind a bush”. Similar to the English phrase “to look like shit”.

Zabrać dupę w troki
Pronunciation: IPA:
To get away, to run away. Usually referring to running away from something problematic.

Zapieprzać
Pronunciation: IPA:
 To be going very fast.
 To be working hard.

Zapierdalać
Pronunciation: IPA:
 To be going very fast.
 To be working hard.
 To steal.
 To stink.
 To beat (especially perform a single-punch knock-out).

Zawracać dupę 
Pronunciation: IPA:
To distract someone, to take their attention away from what they are doing.

Use of profanity 
Numerous studies have been done to examine the way that profanity is used in everyday life situations as well as online. No studies give a definite answer as to whether vulgarity is more common online or not and has proved to be a difficult topic to study as it can change with time as well. One such study looked at different internet forums: one that was an open discussion, a closed discussion, and a social networking site. An open discussion allowed for the most anonymity while the other two conditions required some form of the users identifying themselves. The study found that users often used vulgar expressions criticized other users arguments in the discussions, attacked the users directly or used that language to insult a larger group. At times it is also just used as a way for users to express their general frustrations.

It is said that profanity started being used in songs around the late 1970s and into the 1980s in Poland. It was a response to the state of the country at the time. The youth used vulgar expressions to show their frustrations. Though songs that used such language would not be presented in the mass media, works with profanities more often circulated within communities. This censorship caused for more creative ways of expressing frustrations which lead to a faster development of Polish rock in the 1980s, which became quite popular and influential. Nowadays profanity is also used in more mainstream media at times. Polish pop music does not appear to have as much use of profanity as Polish rap music does. Movies of different genres also use profanity at times.

Word borrowing 
A number of words in the Polish lexicon have been borrowed from foreign languages and used with similar meanings. There are several profane words or expressions that have been borrowed from other languages. One such word would be MILF. Borrowed from the English language, it means exactly what it does in its original context. The use of the abbreviation "WTF", as in "what the fuck" can also be used in Polish profanity. The noun "swołocz" is a borrowing from the Russian "сволочь". Some profanities have been borrowed from German and transcribed phonetically according to their pronunciation, e.g. "szajs" was derived from the German "Scheiße" which carries the same meaning as the Polish word. The appearance of this word in the Polish lexicon could be attributed to the historical partition of Poland where the country was occupied by its neighbors which tended to suppress the use of Polish language and enforce the use of theirs.

References 

Profanity by language
!
Polish language